= Beta phase =

Beta phase may refer to:

- the second phase in a software release life cycle
- the second phase of multiphasic absorption in pharmacokinetics
